Ward may refer to:

Division or unit 

 Hospital ward, a hospital division, floor, or room set aside for a particular class or group of patients, for example the psychiatric ward
 Prison ward, a division of a penal institution such as a prison
 Ward (electoral subdivision), electoral district or unit of local government
 Ward (fortification), part of a castle
 Ward (LDS Church), a local congregation of The Church of Jesus Christ of Latter-day Saints
 Ward (Vietnam), a type of third-tier subdivision of Vietnam

Businesses and organizations 
 WARD (FM), a radio station (91.9 FM) licensed to serve New Paris, Ohio, United States; see List of radio stations in Ohio
 WOUF (AM), a radio station (750 AM) licensed to serve Petoskey, Michigan, United States, which held the call sign WARD from 2008 to 2021
 Warring Adolescents Revenge Division (WARD), organization in The Hardy Boys graphic novels

 Ward Body Works, a school bus manufacturer, now IC Bus
 Ward's, a publisher of Ward's AutoWorld and Ward's Dealer Business
 Wards Brewing Company, a former English brewery, now a brand operated by Double Maxim Beer Company

Law and law enforcement 

 Ward (law), someone placed under the protection of a legal guardian
 Watchman (law enforcement), a security guard
 Ward (feudal)
 Justice Ward (disambiguation)

Names 

 Ward (surname)
 Ward (given name)
 Ward, short form of the given names:
 Edward
 Howard
 Hereward

Places 
The Ward, Toronto, neighbourhood in central Toronto
 Ward, Castleknock, Ireland
 Ward, New Zealand

United States 
 Ward, Alabama
 Ward, Arkansas
 Ward, Colorado
 Ward, Indiana
 Ward, New York
 Ward, South Carolina
 Ward, South Dakota
 Ward, Washington
 Ward, West Virginia
 Ward Reservation, Massachusetts
 Ward Township, Todd County, Minnesota
 Ward Township, Hocking County, Ohio
 Ward Township, Tioga County, Pennsylvania

Vessels 

 , various United States Navy destroyers
 , a U.S. Navy destroyer

Other 
 Ward (magic), a word or symbol supposedly embued with protective magic
 Ward (fencing), defensive position in the sport of fencing
 The Ward (disambiguation)
 Ward County (disambiguation)
 "Ward", by C418 from Minecraft - Volume Beta, 2013

See also 

 Warded lock